Caulorhiza is a genus of fungi in the family Tricholomataceae. The genus, which contains three species found in the US, was circumscribed by Joanne Lennox in 1979.

See also

List of Tricholomataceae genera

References

Tricholomataceae
Agaricales genera